Rolf Morgan Hansen (born 21 June 1961) is a Norwegian former cyclist. He competed in the 1000m time trial event at the 1984 Summer Olympics.

References

External links
 

1961 births
Living people
Norwegian male cyclists
Olympic cyclists of Norway
Cyclists at the 1984 Summer Olympics
People from Sandefjord
Sportspeople from Vestfold og Telemark